Timoninskoye is a rural locality (a village) in Biryakovskoye Rural Settlement, Sokolsky District, Vologda Oblast, Russia. The population was 6 as of 2002.

Geography 
Timoninskoye is located 106 km northeast of Sokol (the district's administrative centre) by road. Sledovo is the nearest rural locality.

References 

Rural localities in Sokolsky District, Vologda Oblast